Philippe Van Volckxsom (1 May 1897 – 20 December 1939) was a Belgian athlete who competed at the 1920 and 1928 Summer Olympics and at the first Winter Olympics in 1924. Recorded as being deployed as both a forward and a defenceman, he finished fifth and seventh with the Belgian ice hockey team in 1920 and 1924, respectively, and in 1924 he also took part in speed skating events. In 1928 he competed in rowing, together with the fellow ice hockey player Carlos Van den Driessche, but failed to reach the final of the coxless pairs event.

See also
List of athletes who competed in both the Summer and Winter Olympic games

References

External links
 

1897 births
1939 deaths
Belgian male rowers
Belgian male speed skaters
Ice hockey players at the 1920 Summer Olympics
Ice hockey players at the 1924 Winter Olympics
Olympic ice hockey players of Belgium
Olympic rowers of Belgium
Olympic speed skaters of Belgium
Rowers at the 1928 Summer Olympics
Speed skaters at the 1924 Winter Olympics
Sportspeople from Brussels
Belgian ice hockey forwards
Belgian ice hockey defencemen